Dobroń is a commuter station and a block post located in the village of Dobroń, in Pabianice County, Łódź Voivodeship, Poland, serving a section of Łódź-Tuplice railway between Pabianice and Łask stations.

The station was opened in 1927. Electrification took place in 1965. The station consists of two platforms, each serving one track of the railway, a single-level secured crossroad and the signalling control building. Station only serves regional trains of Łódzka Kolej Aglomeracyjna from Łódź to Sieradz and PolRegio trains from Łódź to Poznań and Wrocław.

Due to upgrades of the railway, since 2018 the station was repurposed as a temporary branch post, by installing two switches between the tracks on the western side of the station. After refurbishment is done, this will become an automatic block post.

Train services
The station is served by the following services:

 InterRegio services (IR) Ostrów Wielkopolski — Łódź — Warszawa Główna
 InterRegio services (IR) Poznań Główny — Ostrów Wielkopolski — Łódź — Warszawa Główna
 Regiona services (PR) Łódź Kaliska — Ostrów Wielkopolski 
 Regional services (PR) Łódź Kaliska — Ostrów Wielkopolski — Poznań Główny

References 

Railway stations in Poland opened in 1927
Railway stations in Łódź Voivodeship
Railway stations served by Łódzka Kolej Aglomeracyjna